Matthew McDade Phelan (born September 18, 1975) is an American real estate developer and Republican member of the Texas House of Representatives for District 21, which includes most of Jefferson and Orange Counties in the southeast corner of the state. He has served as Speaker of the Texas House of Representatives since January 2021.

Background

Phelan is a 1994 graduate of Monsignor Kelly Catholic High School in Beaumont and a 1998 graduate of the University of Texas at Austin.

State legislator

Phelan currently serves as Speaker of the Texas House of Representatives. He has served previously as Chair of the House Committee on State Affairs, on the Natural Resources Committee as Vice-Chair, the Calendars Committee, the Appropriations Committee, Elections Committee as well as the Select Committee on Ports, Innovation and Infrastructure. He is also a founding member of the House Criminal Justice Reform Caucus.

Phelan was named a “Champion of Infrastructure” by the lobbying group The American Council of Engineering Companies of Texas and was twice a finalist for “Newsmaker of the Year” by the Press Club of Southeast Texas.

Texas Monthly recognized Phelan as one of the best legislators of 2019.

On December 2, 2020, Phelan was traveling in a private plane to meet Representative Trent Ashby when it crashed on landing during a rainstorm at Angelina County Airport near Lufkin, Texas. There were no serious injuries.

Speaker of the Texas House of Representatives
On January 12, 2021, Phelan was elected the 76th Speaker of the Texas House of Representatives. He is the first Speaker of the House in state history from Southeast Texas.

Voting rights
On August 12, 2021, Phelan signed arrest warrants for the 52 Democratic lawmakers who had left the state to deny a quorum. The lawmakers were attempting to block the passage of legislation considered by certain civil rights groups to restrict voting access to voters of color. During the House debate on the bill, Phelan banned Texas representatives from using the word "racism".

Personal life
He is a former board secretary to Catholic Charities of Southeast Texas and a former board member of the St. Anne Roman Catholic Church, the historic Jefferson Theatre, Southeast Texas CASA and the Golden Triangle Conservation Association. In 2019 he was installed as a Director to the Texas Lyceum.

Phelan and his wife, Kim, live in Jefferson County, Texas with their four young boys.

References

External links
 Campaign website
 State legislative page
 Dade Phelan at the Texas Tribune

|-

1975 births
21st-century American politicians
American real estate businesspeople
Businesspeople from Texas
Catholics from Texas
Living people
Republican Party members of the Texas House of Representatives
People from Beaumont, Texas
Speakers of the Texas House of Representatives
University of Texas at Austin alumni